The NCAA Division III Women's Tennis Championship is the annual tennis tournament hosted by the National Collegiate Athletic Association (NCAA) to determine the team, singles, and doubles champions of Division III in women's collegiate tennis.

Tennis was one of twelve women's sports added to the NCAA championship program for the 1981–82 school year, as the NCAA engaged in battle with the Association for Intercollegiate Athletics for Women (AIAW) for sole governance of women's collegiate sports. The AIAW continued to conduct its established championship program in the same twelve (and other) sports; however, after a year of dual women's championships, the NCAA conquered the AIAW and usurped its authority and membership.

Williams has won the most national championships, with 10 national titles. Emory is the reigning national champion, winning their ninth title in 2021 by beating the defending champions, Wesleyan in the championships.

Results

Champions

Team titles

Singles titles

Doubles titles

 Schools highlight in yellow have reclassified from NCAA Division III.

See also
NCAA Women's Tennis Championships (Division I, Division II)
NCAA Men's Tennis Championships (Division I, Division II, Division III)
AIAW Intercollegiate Women's Tennis Champions
NAIA Women's Tennis Championship

References

External links
NCAA Division III Women's Tennis

Tennis, Women's
College tennis in the United States
Ncaa Women's Division III
Women's tennis in the United States